Paracorixa is a genus of true bugs belonging to the family Corixidae.

The species of this genus are found in Europe and Russia.

Species:
 Paracorixa concinna (Fieber, 1848)

References

Corixidae